Cristóbal Osvaldo Marín Barrios (born 3 June 1994) is a Chilean footballer who plays as a midfielder for Barnechea in the Primera B de Chile.

Career
On second half 2022, he left Coquimbo Unido and joined Barnechea in the Primera B de Chile.

Personal life
He is nicknamed Chicote.

Honours
Coquimbo Unido
  Primera B (1): 2021

References

External links

1994 births
Living people
People from La Serena
Chilean footballers
Chilean Primera División players
Primera B de Chile players
Deportes La Serena footballers
Audax Italiano footballers
Coquimbo Unido footballers
A.C. Barnechea footballers
Association football midfielders